Falamak Joneidi (born ) is an Iranian television actress.

Career
She has appeared in the television series Char Khooneh, Jayezeye Bozorg, Marde Do Hezar Chehreh, Mard-e Hezar-Chehreh  and Shabhaye Barareh.

Filmography

Film 

 No Men Allowed (2011)

Television

References

External links

1973 births
Living people
People from Mashhad
People from Tehran
Iranian film actresses
Iranian television actresses